The II 2011 Beach South American Games were held in Manta, Ecuador.

Venues
In order to provide the audience in Manta, Ecuador with overall comfort during the opening of the II South American Beach Games Manta 2011, the organizers decided to expand the capacity of the main stage that rises in the Playa El Murciélago from 4,000 to 5,000 spectators.

The committee organizing the Games (COMANTA) expects to host more than a thousand athletes from 10 participating countries, as well as dignitaries, officials, special guests and the general public, said Alberto Adum, executive director of the Games.

The opening ceremony is scheduled for the afternoon of Friday, December 2, with a show, which according to Adum, is unprecedented in sports events conducted in Ecuador.

Although he prefers to keep the inaugural program a surprise, Adum said that the opening will include an air show that will include the participation of a group of parachutists, and more than 150 artists will offer performances based on the main characteristics of the host city.

Sports including rugby union, soccer, beach handball, and beach volleyball will be hosted in this event.

The host city staff are working on the construction of additional features besides the main stage (changing rooms, showers, bathrooms, etc.), which they expect will be completed in November.

Sports
Nine sports were contested in this edition of South American Beach Games.

 Beach handball
 Beach rugby
 Beach soccer
 Beach volleyball
 Open water swimming
 Sailing
 Surfing
 Triathlon
 Water ski

Participating nations
Ten nations participated in this edition of South American Beach Games.

Medal table
27 gold medals were awarded in the Games. Brazil topped the medal table in this edition of the South American Beach Games.

References

2011 in Ecuadorian sport
Beach South American Games
Beach South American Games
2011 in South American sport
Multi-sport events in Ecuador
Manta, Ecuador
South American Beach Games
December 2011 sports events in South America